The Modern Dance is the debut album by American rock band Pere Ubu. It was released in January 1978 by record label Blank.

A 5.1 surround sound version was released as the DVD-Audio side of a DualDisc in 2005.

Critical reception

The Modern Dance has been critically acclaimed. Reviewing for The Village Voice in 1978, Robert Christgau wrote that "even though there's too much Radio Ethiopia and not enough 'Redondo Beach,'" he would be "listening through the failed stuff—the highs are worth it." In Christgau's Record Guide: Rock Albums of the Seventies (1981), he reaffirmed that "the highs are worth it, and the failed stuff ain't bad" in his revised review. Ken Tucker, writing in Rolling Stone, called it vivid and exhilarating, even if "harsh and willfully ugly".

NME named The Modern Dance the 11th best album of 1978. Fact placed the record at number 31 on its list of the 100 best albums of the 1970s.

Track listing

Personnel
Pere Ubu
 David Thomas – vocals, musette, percussion, production
 Tom Herman – guitar, backing vocals, production
 Allen Ravenstine – EML 101 and 200 analog synthesizers, saxophone, tapes, production
 Tony Maimone – bass, piano, backing vocals, production
 Scott Krauss – drums, production
 Tim Wright – bass guitar on "The Modern Dance" and "Sentimental Journey", production

Technical
 S. W. Taylor – sleeve artwork
 Ken Hamann – engineering, production
 Mike Bishop – engineering assistance
 Paul Hamann – engineering assistance
 Mik Mellen – sleeve photography

Release history

References

External links
 

1978 debut albums
Pere Ubu albums
Fontana Records albums
Mercury Records albums
Rough Trade Records albums
Cooking Vinyl albums
DGC Records albums
Fire Records (UK) albums